Buckland is a historic plantation house located near Buckland, Gates County, North Carolina.  It was built about 1795, and is a two-story, five-bay, transitional Georgian / Federal style frame dwelling with a double-pile center-hall plan.  It has paired, double shouldered brick exterior end chimneys. The front facade features a handsome double-tier pedimented portico protecting the central three bays.

It was listed on the National Register of Historic Places in 1986.

References

Plantation houses in North Carolina
Houses on the National Register of Historic Places in North Carolina
Federal architecture in North Carolina
Georgian architecture in North Carolina
Houses completed in 1795
Houses in Gates County, North Carolina
National Register of Historic Places in Gates County, North Carolina